David Hein is a Canadian librettist, composer-lyricist, musician, and actor best known for co-writing the Broadway musical Come from Away with his writing partner and wife, Irene Sankoff.

Hein was born in Regina, Saskatchewan, and was educated at Lisgar Collegiate Institute in Ottawa and York University in Toronto, Ontario. After graduating, he and his fiancée moved to New York City in 1999 where he worked at a music studio and she studied at the Actors Studio. After spending several years studying and working in New York the couple returned to Toronto where Hein wrote a song "My Mother's Lesbian Jewish Wiccan Wedding", about his mother and her later life partner, which he and Sankoff expanded into a play that was staged at the Toronto Fringe Festival in 2009 and then picked up by Mirvish Productions for a run at Toronto's Panasonic Theatre before touring Canada.

As a result of My Mother’s Lesbian Jewish Wiccan Wedding success, theatre producer Michael Rubinoff approached Hein and Sankoff with his idea about a show based on Operation Yellow Ribbon in which residents of Gander, Newfoundland, housed 7,000 airline passengers who had been stranded at Gander Airport  as a result of the grounding of all North American air flights following the September 11 attacks, which became the musical Come from Away.

References

21st-century Canadian dramatists and playwrights
Living people
Male actors from Regina, Saskatchewan
Musicians from Regina, Saskatchewan
Writers from Regina, Saskatchewan
Canadian songwriters
York University alumni
Lisgar Collegiate Institute alumni
Jewish Canadian musicians
Jewish Canadian male actors
Canadian male musical theatre actors
Year of birth missing (living people)